Seelawathie Rambukwella Gopallawa (died October 4, 1977) was a Sri Lankan public figure, First Lady of Sri Lanka from 1972 to 1977, and wife of former President William Gopallawa. Gopallawa served as the country's inaugural first lady following her husband's assumption of the presidency in 1972.

Biography
Gopallawa was born Seelawathie Rambukwella to L. B. Rambukwelle. She married William Gopallawa, a lawyer and then-member of the Matale Urban Council, on March 8, 1928. The couple had four children: two daughters, Iranganie and Chintha, and two sons, Asoka and Monty. Her youngest son, Monty Gopallawa, served as Minister of Cultural Affairs from 2000 to 2001 and Governor of Central Province from 2002 until 2005.

Gopallawa's husband, William Gopallawa, served as the Governor-General of Ceylon from 1962 to 1972. In 1972, Seelawathie Gopallawa became the first First Lady of Sri Lanka when Sri Lanka became a republic and her husband assumed the presidency. 

Gopallawa served as the country's inaugural first lady until her death on October 4, 1977. Her ashes were buried in the Gopallawa family cemetery in Dullewa following her cremation. Like her husband, who died in 1981, Seelawathie Gopallawa donated her eyes to the  Sri Lanka Eye Donation Society following her death.

She had lived as the family home in Dharmapala Mawatha, Matale.

References

Date of birth unknown
Year of birth unknown 
1977 deaths
First ladies and gentlemen of Sri Lanka
Gopallawa family
People from Matale